Dan Evans was the defending champion but lost in the quarterfinals to Denis Kudla.

Frances Tiafoe won the title after defeating Kudla 6–1, 6–3 in the final.

Seeds

Draw

Finals

Top half

Bottom half

References

External links 
Main draw
Qualifying draw

Nottingham Open - 1
Men's Singles